Terry William Mitchell (born 11 September 1950) is a former New Zealand rugby union player. A wing, Mitchell represented Golden Bay-Motueka and then Nelson Bays (after the former's amalgamation with Nelson), and later Canterbury at a provincial level. He was a member of the New Zealand national side, the All Blacks, from 1974 to 1976, playing 17 matches including one international as a substitute.

References

Parents: Maui and Doreen Mitchell.

1950 births
Living people
Canterbury rugby union players
Golden Bay-Motueka rugby union players
Māori All Blacks players
Nelson Bays rugby union players
New Zealand international rugby union players
New Zealand rugby union players
People educated at Golden Bay High School
People from Tākaka
Rugby union players from the Tasman District
Rugby union wings